I Giorni (2001) is a music album by the Italian pianist Ludovico Einaudi. The album's title translates as "The Days" in English. The title track, "I Giorni" has had a lot of interest due to Greg James' airing in June 2011 of the piece on BBC Radio 1. It entered the UK Singles Chart at number 32 on 12 June 2011.
The solo piano track of the same name has been featured on a BBC advert for arts and culture programmes. The same solo track has also been used in a commercial for the Indian telecom service provider Airtel, to launch its 3G services in the sub-continent in November 2010. It featured in the Amazon Prime advert "Vicar and Imam" in late 2016. The single was certified gold for 400,000 adjusted sales in United Kingdom in 2022.

Track listing

Charts

Certifications

References

2002 classical albums
Ludovico Einaudi albums
Instrumental albums